John Richard Rooney (born 17 December 1990) is an English professional footballer who plays as an attacking midfielder for Oldham Athletic.

He is the younger brother of D.C United manager and former England forward Wayne Rooney. Although born in England, Rooney has expressed a desire to represent the Republic of Ireland at international level.

Early life
John Rooney was born in Liverpool, Merseyside to Jeanette Maria Rooney (née Morrey) and Thomas Wayne Rooney. He is of Irish descent and was brought up in Croxteth with older brothers Graeme and Wayne; all three attended Our Lady and St. Swithin's primary school and the De La Salle Humanities College.

Career

Everton
John Rooney started at the Everton Youth Academy at the age of six.

Macclesfield Town
After being released by Everton, Rooney moved to Macclesfield Town in 2002, where he signed professional terms on 14 July 2008, 4 months after his professional debut against Barnet on 24 March 2008. His first ever career goal came against Dagenham & Redbridge in a 2–1 loss on 28 March 2009. Rooney's Macclesfield contract expired at the end of the 2009–10 season (after refusing to sign a new contract).

New York Red Bulls
After trials with Derby County and Huddersfield Town were unsuccessful Rooney went to Seattle Sounders FC and Portland Timbers on trial to enter the next Major League Soccer Draft. Rooney signed with Major League Soccer on 28 December 2010 and played at the 2011 MLS Combine in Florida.

On 13 January 2011, Rooney was selected in the second round of the 2011 MLS SuperDraft by New York Red Bulls. He made his debut for the club on 16 April as an 89th-minute substitute in a 3–0 victory over San Jose Earthquakes at Red Bull Arena. On 28 June in his first start for New York, Rooney scored his first goal for the club in a 2–1 victory over FC New York in the US Open Cup.

Orlando City
Rooney was waived by New York on 23 November 2011 and he signed with USL Pro club Orlando City on 27 January 2012.

On 25 February 2013, in his debut, Rooney scored his first goal with the club against Toronto FC in the Walt Disney World Pro Soccer Classic in a 2–2 draw. On 15 April, Rooney scored two goals and assisted a goal in a 4–1 win against the Wilmington Hammerheads. On 22 May, Rooney again scored two goals in the second round of the US Open Cup in a 7–0 trashing of KC Athletics.
On 27 July, Orlando City won the 2012 Regular season title after they defeated the Charleston Battery 4–0 (with 3 games remaining in the season), as a result, John Rooney won his first championship in his career. Rooney finished the season with 13 appearances and 5 goals as Orlando were eliminated in the Semi-final of the Playoffs to the Wilmington Hammerheads.

Barnsley
After leaving Orlando City, Rooney was offered a contract by English club Barnsley in October 2012. He signed a contract with the club on 25 October 2012. He was released at the end of the season.

Bury
On 10 July 2013, Bury announced they had signed Rooney on a twelve-month contract.

Chester
He was loaned to Conference Premier side Chester until January 2014. He made four appearances and scored once. In January 2014, the transfer was permanent as he signed a contract keeping him until the end of 2014–15 season.

Wrexham
On 7 June 2016, Rooney signed a one-year deal with Wrexham. He made his debut for the club on the opening day of the 2016–17 season, in a 0–0 draw with Dover Athletic, scoring his first goal for the club in their following match, converting a penalty during a 3–2 victory over Guiseley.

In February 2017, Rooney joined Guiseley on loan for the remainder of the 2016–17 season after being unable to agree terms over a contract dispute. Following his return to Wrexham at the end of the season, Rooney was one of several players who were not offered new deals.

Barrow
In July 2018 he joined Barrow on a one-year contract. He helped them win the Vanarama National League title in the 2019-20 season, scoring 19 league goals from midfield in that curtailed season, becoming the club's second top scorer after Scott Quigley, winning several club awards and the Mark Harrop National League Player of the Season.  .

Stockport County
On 20 July 2020, Rooney signed for National League side Stockport County for an undisclosed fee.

Barrow return
On 30 January 2022, Rooney returned to League Two side Barrow for an undisclosed fee on a two-and-a-half year deal.

Oldham Athletic
On 27 September 2022, Rooney signed for National League club Oldham Athletic on a two-year deal with the option for a third following the mutual termination of his Barrow contract earlier that day.

Personal life
He is the younger brother of D.C. United manager and former England captain Wayne Rooney.

His cousin, Tommy Rooney, also played for Macclesfield Town in the 2004–05 Football League Two.

Career statistics

Honours
Orlando City SC
USL Pro: 2012

Barrow
National League: 2019–20

Individual 
National League Team of the Year: 2019–20, 2020–21
National League Player of the Month: January 2017, September 2019
National League Player of the Year: 2019–20, 2020–21

References

External links

1990 births
Living people
English people of Irish descent
Footballers from Liverpool
English footballers
Association football midfielders
Everton F.C. players
Macclesfield Town F.C. players
New York Red Bulls draft picks
New York Red Bulls players
Orlando City SC (2010–2014) players
Barnsley F.C. players
Bury F.C. players
Chester F.C. players
Wrexham A.F.C. players
Guiseley A.F.C. players
Barrow A.F.C. players
Stockport County F.C. players
Oldham Athletic A.F.C. players
English Football League players
Major League Soccer players
USL Championship players
National League (English football) players
English expatriate footballers
English expatriate sportspeople in the United States
Expatriate soccer players in the United States
Rooney family (England)